Aura River may refer to one of the following rivers:

 Aura (Sinn), a river in Bavaria, Germany
 Aura River (Finland), a river in southwestern Finland
 Aura (Norway), a river in Nesset Municipality, Norway
 Aurá River, a river in Maranhão state, Brazil